Hannah Lowe (born 1976) is a British writer, known for her collection of poetry Chick (2013), her family memoir Long Time, No See (2015) and her research into the historicising of the SS Empire Windrush and postwar Caribbean migration to Britain. Her 2021 book The Kids won the Costa Book of the Year award.

Biography
Lowe was born in Ilford, Essex, in 1976. She studied American Literature at the University of Sussex, and has a master's degree in Refugee Studies, subsequently completing a PhD in Creative Writing at Newcastle University. She taught English Literature at a London sixth form, and went on to teach Creative Writing at Oxford Brookes University, Kingston University. She now lectures at Brunel University.

Lowe began writing poetry at the age of 29 after her Jamaican-Chinese father died and her English mother had a stroke, later reflecting: "I had been suppressing a lot of grief over a sustained period of time and poetry... opened a door on that pain. I found that I could revisit the past in my poems, and contain it, or alter it even."

Following a suggestion by John Glenday at a course in 2010, Lowe began to write about her father — who had sailed from Jamaica to Britain on the SS Ormonde in 1947 — and this led to her debut poetry collection Chick, published by Bloodaxe Books in 2013. This work was shortlisted for the Forward and Fenton Adelburgh First Collection Prizes. In September 2014, the Poetry Book Society included Lowe in its list of Next Generation Poets, published each decade. In 2015, Chick won the Michael Murphy Memorial Award for Best First Collection.

Lowe's family memoir Long Time, No See was published by Periscope in July 2015 and was featured on BBC Radio 4's Book of the Week. Lowe cites Gerard Manley Hopkins, Anne Sexton, and Mark Doty as influences for her work.

Lowe's 2018 chapbook The Neighbourhood, published by Out-Spoken in 2018, is a social commentary on communities and gentrification that emerged from her role as poet-in-residence at Keats House, London. In 2020, she won a Cholmondeley Award from the Society of Authors. Her collection, The Kids, was published by Bloodaxe in 2021. It was shortlisted for the 2021 T. S. Eliot Prize.

Lowe's 2021 book of sonnets, titled The Kids, was based on her 10 years of experience teaching in an inner-city London sixth-form centre, City and Islington College, during the 2000s, as well as drawing on her own experiences as a teenager and as a mother. She said in an interview in The Guardian: "I was trying to destabilise that relationship between the teacher and student – the idea of the teacher being the figure with knowledge to impart, and the student as the passive receptacle. It was never like that in the classroom for me." The Irish Times reviewer said that "the power of Lowe's use of the sonnet feels akin to controlling a classroom – the form acts to hold and strain against the blustering energy of the students and the teacher. The Kids is an honest and intelligent book." The Kids won the Costa Book Award for poetry in 2021 and was later chosen as the overall Costa Book of the Year for 2021, with chair of judges Reeta Chakrabarti describing it as "a book to fall in love with – it's joyous, it's warm and it's completely universal. It's crafted and skilful but also accessible."

In May 2022, Lowe's two new poetry chapbooks – Old Friends and Rock, Bird, Butterfly – were published by Hercules Editions.

Bibliography
 The Hitcher (32 pages), 2011
 Chick, 2013, 
 Ormonde (chapbook), 2014, 
 Long Time, No See, 2015,  
 Chan, 2016, 
 The Neighbourhood, 2019, 
 The Kids, 2021, 
 Old Friends (chapbook), 2022
 Rock, Bird, Butterfly (chapbook), 2022

References

External links
 Hannah Lowe website
 Melissa Richards, "Making her claim: Writer Hannah Lowe", Caribbean Beat, Issue 124 (November/December 2013).
 Jennifer Won, "On Home, Belongingness, and Multicultural Britain: A Conversation with Hannah Lowe", World Literature Today, March 2018.
 "Hannah Lowe: The Kids" (recording), Writers Mosaic, September 2021. Hannah Lowe, "Writing The Kids: Some thoughts about memory, truth and ethics" – text version.  

1976 births
21st-century British poets
21st-century British women writers
Academics of Oxford Brookes University
British women memoirists
Costa Book Award winners
English people of Chinese descent
English people of Jamaican descent
Living people
People from Ilford
Schoolteachers from Essex